Rue Pastourelle is a street in the third district (or arrondissement) of Paris.

Its nearest metro stations are Arts et Métiers and Saint-Sébastien - Froissart.

It starts at Rue Charlot and ends at Boulevard du Temple. The street is named for Roger Pastourelle who lived here in 1378 when he was a member of the French parliament.

References

Streets in the 3rd arrondissement of Paris